Kobylinka is a rural locality (a village) in Bogoroditsky District of Tula Oblast, Russia.

References

Rural localities in Tula Oblast